The Arabic nisbah (attributive title) al-Andalusi denotes an origin from al-Andalus. Al-Andalusi may refer to:
 Abu Hayyan al-Gharnati
 Ibn Hazm
 Ibn Juzayy
 Ibn 'Atiyya
 Said Al-Andalusi
 Yaʿīsh ibn Ibrāhīm al-Umawī

See also
 Andalusi (disambiguation)
 Andalusia (disambiguation)
 Andalusian (disambiguation)

Arabic-language surnames
Andalusi
People from al-Andalus
Ethnonymic surnames